Jasmine Karolina Kara Khatib-Nia (born 23 June 1988), known by her stage name Jasmine Kara, is a Swedish-Iranian singer, songwriter, and author. Her breakthrough came in the summer of 2010, when she sang in Allsång på Skansen and at a concert held in connection with the Wedding of Victoria, Crown Princess of Sweden, and Daniel Westling. Since then, she has been in many Swedish music TV shows such as Let's Dance on TV4, Lotta på Liseberg, Moraeus Med Mera. and has toured in Sweden, Japan, UK and the United States.

In the Persian music industry, she has appeared in TV shows like Sina Valiollah Show, Shabe Jomeh, Chaharshanbe Suri (Eldfesten) for Manoto TV and MBC Persia. She has also had success as a songwriter, wth two number one albums on the world charts, one on iTunes (Kick Back by WayV) and a Billboard number one with the song 100 on the album SuperOne by SuperM.

Biography
Jasmine Kara was born and raised in Örebro, Sweden, to a Swedish mother and an Iranian father. At an early age, she realised music was her big interest and she participated in numerous local talent shows. During her late teens, she was in an abusive relationship and it was at that time that she used music to feel better again. Jasmine Kara has released the biographic book Hälsa Henne Att Hon Ska Dö (en: Tell Her She's Dead), in which she talks about her abusive relationship and her childhood.

At the age of eighteen, Jasmine Kara moved to New York City, United States to fulfill her dream of signing a record deal. She succeeded in getting gigs in Brooklyn, Queens and on Manhattan. She sang in front of Beyoncé and Jay-Z when they visited a club where she was performing. In the end, a newly established record label, the Tri-Sound owned by Marshall Chess, signed Kara. Marshall Chess later became the executive producer for Kara's first music album Blues Ain't Nothing But A Good Woman Gone Bad, which was released on 28 July 2010 and was recorded at Cosmos Studios in Stockholm. In 2012 the same album was also released in Japan and got attention. Songs from the album were radiolisted on J -Wave, Tokyo FM and on Tokyo Hot 100 list.

The album “Blues Aint Nothing But A Good Woman Gone Bad” was released in the UK in March 2010 and the single “In the Basement” was placed number one on iTunes blues list. Several of Jasmine's songs were playlisted on BBC and she performed live in UK radio shows such as Robert Elms Show, Sir Terry Wogan's show Weekend Wogan, and Chris Evans breakfast show. The single “Try my Love Again” was featured in  the clothing company M&Co ‘s TV commercial that was aired in Ireland, Wales and the UK.

In 2010, Jasmine Kara became known to the Swedish audience when she participated in Allsång på Skansen on Sveriges Television (SVT), and she also participated as a celebrity contestant on Körslaget on TV4 in 2011 In 2013 Kara performed at Lotta på Liseberg.

Kara competed as a celebrity dancer in Let's Dance 2014 partnering with professional dancer Stefano Oradei. She was eliminated on 4 April 2014 after her fifth appearance and performance on the show.

Kara participated in Melodifestivalen 2017 with the song "Gravity". The song reached number 57 on Sverigetopplistan, but she was eliminated in the third semi-final.

She began singing in Persian for the first time on Eldfesten (Chaharshanbe Suri) in 2018 and it was televised on Manoto TV and SVT. Since then she has done many more performances for the Iranian audience, like Sina Valiollah show, Shabe Jomeh and Echo on Manoto TV and has released three songs in Persian: Lab-khand (Smile), Bord-i az Yaad-am (you've forgotten me) and Miresim be Asemoon-ha (we'll reach the skies) feat. Rana Farhan.

Discography

Studio albums

EPs

Singles

As lead artist

Other Songwriting Credits

Bibliography
2010: Hälsa Henne Att Hon Ska Dö (autobiography)

References

External links

Official website

1988 births
People from Örebro
Living people
Swedish people of Iranian descent
Swedish songwriters
English-language singers from Sweden
Swedish soul singers
20th-century Swedish women singers
21st-century Swedish women singers
Melodifestivalen contestants of 2017